Zeri Rural District is in Qatur District of Khoy County, West Azerbaijan province, Iran. At the National Census of 2006, its population was 9,513 in 1,729 households. There were 9,472 inhabitants in 2,047 households at the following census of 2011. At the most recent census of 2016, the population of the rural district was 8,339 in 2,000 households. The largest of its 12 villages was Gugerd, with 1,989 people.

References 

Khoy County

Rural Districts of West Azerbaijan Province

Populated places in West Azerbaijan Province

Populated places in Khoy County